Joachim Brandt Hansen (born 18 August 1990) is a Danish professional golfer who currently plays on the European Tour.

Early life and amateur career
Hansen was born in Hillerød. He took up golf at the age of 12 enjoyed a successful amateur career which culminated with representing his country, and being the lowest-scoring player in the 2010 Eisenhower Trophy.

Professional career
Hansen turned professional following this performance, earning a place on the Challenge Tour after three runner-up finishes on the third-tier Nordic League in 2011.

A further three runner-up finishes at Challenge Tour level, during Hansen's rookie 2012 season, earned him fourth place in the season-ending rankings and a further promotion to the European Tour. In 2013, Hansen managed to finish in a tie for third at the Aberdeen Asset Management Scottish Open, where he briefly led late in the final round despite carding a quadruple-bogey nine at his second hole.

In 2019, Hansen finished second at the Amundi Open de France, one stroke behind Nicolas Colsaerts.

Hansen's first victory on the European Tour came in November 2020, where he shot a final round 67 to win the Joburg Open. He won the Aviv Dubai Championship in November 2021 to claim his second victory on the European Tour.

Amateur wins
2010 Eisenhower Trophy (individual leader), Finnish Amateur

Professional wins (6)

European Tour wins (2)

1Co-sanctioned by the Sunshine Tour

Challenge Tour wins (2)

Challenge Tour playoff record (0–1)

Nordic Golf League wins (2)

Team appearances
Amateur
European Boys' Team Championship (representing Denmark): 2008
European Amateur Team Championship (representing Denmark): 2009, 2010
Eisenhower Trophy (representing Denmark): 2010 (individual leader)

See also
2012 Challenge Tour graduates
2015 Challenge Tour graduates
2018 Challenge Tour graduates

References

External links

Danish male golfers
European Tour golfers
Olympic golfers of Denmark
Golfers at the 2020 Summer Olympics
Sportspeople from the Capital Region of Denmark
People from Hillerød Municipality
People from Hørsholm Municipality
1990 births
Living people